Gumplin was a German Hebrew satirical poet of unknown date. The only poem of his that has been preserved is Shir la'ag al bnei Reinus, a satire of seven strophes, ending with a refrain in which he very wittily criticizes the inhabitants of the Rhine Province. The name "Gumplin" is given in acrostic. Abraham Geiger published the poem, together with a German translation, in his Melo Chofnajim.

References
 

Date of birth unknown
Date of death unknown
Hebrew-language poets
Jewish German writers
German satirists